Hurricane Streets (also known as Hurricane) is a 1997 American coming-of-age drama film directed and written by Morgan J. Freeman in his feature directorial debut. It shows the story of Marcus (Brendan Sexton III), a teenage inner-city 'street kid' in New York City whose internal conflicts include running with a gang who want to move up in more serious crimes and a girl he meets (Isidra Vega) who tries to steer him clear from a potential life in prison. What Marcus really wants is to move out of the city to New Mexico and gain space.

The film won the Audience, Best Director, and Best Cinematography Awards at the 1997 Sundance Film Festival—the first film ever to win three awards at the festival. It was released by United Artists and stars Brendan Sexton III and Edie Falco.

Plot

14-year-old Marcus Frederick (Brendan Sexton III) resides in Manhattan's Lower East Side with his grandmother, Lucy (Lynn Cohen). His mother, Joanna (Edie Falco), has spent the last nine years of Marcus's life in prison for smuggling undocumented people into New Mexico. Presumably, Marcus's father died in a car accident when Marcus was five.  Lucy owns and operates her own establishment called Lucy's, where she works as a bartender, giving Marcus a lot of unsupervised time to spend  with his four friends Chip (David Roland Frank), Benny (Carlo Alban), Louis (Mtume Gant), and Harold (Antoine McLean). The group spends the majority of their time committing petty theft and hanging around in their underground clubhouse near the waterfront. Chip has grown tired of the small-time crime and wants to move into more serious theft, such as robbery.

Marcus has aspirations to move back to his home state of New Mexico and live on a ranch with his uncle Billy who had promised to mail Marcus an airplane ticket. However, Lucy doesn't believe Billy was being serious.

Later that day, Marcus sells stolen merchandise to children during recess at the local elementary school while Chip serves as a lookout. There, Marcus meets 14-year-old Melena (Isidra Vega). Marcus invites Melena to his fifteenth birthday party, although she declines claiming her abusive father, Paco (Shawn Elliott), a tow truck driver, doesn't approve of her staying out late.

That night, Melena sneaks out of her apartment and meets Marcus in front of the bar where she gives him her ski mask as a gift before leaving. The next morning, Marcus receives the flight ticket to New Mexico in the mail and relays this information to Lucy. Mack (L.M. Kit Carson), a regular patron at the bar, reveals to Lucy he actually sent Marcus the ticket (under the guise of Billy) believing it would do Marcus good if he left the city.

Marcus, Benny, and Louis are subsequently introduced to Justin (Damian Corrente) and Shane (David Moscow), Chip's drug dealing friends from Miami. Marcus tells Melena about his plans to move to New Mexico and offers her to join him. Melena declines, knowing her father would never approve and not being able to afford the price of the ticket.

Afterwards, Marcus gets caught by a plainclothes officer named Kramer (Jose Zuniga) after he continues to sell stolen merchandise to the elementary school children and is hauled off to the police station. Marcus is interrogated by Kramer and another detective named Hank (Richard Petrocelli) who threaten to charge him with commercial burglary and inform him that his mother is in prison for murder, not smuggling undocumented aliens like she had told him (it is implied 
that Joanna killed his father.)

Marcus visits his mother and tells her about his meeting with Melena and the two of them planning to travel to New Mexico. Marcus then reveals that he knows she's in prison for killing his father. Joanna explains that his father was abusive towards her and Marcus and didn't know how to tell Marcus without him being upset. She also admits that she isn't up for parole until another four years, but promises Marcus they will go to New Mexico once she is out. Marcus is clearly done with her promises and leaves.

Later, Marcus returns to the clubhouse where he is surprised by Mack who is a wanted fugitive hiding out from the police. Marcus sympathetically gives his ticket to Mack in hopes that it will help him with his dilemma. The following day, Marcus tells Melena and friends his decision to remain in New York in order to straighten his life out.

At the clubhouse, the group reveals to Marcus they plan on breaking into a policeman's (Leslie Body) apartment and stealing his valuables. Marcus refuses to get involved after his run-in with the police. Paco drives to the clubhouse's location where Melena and Marcus congregate regularly. When Paco starts to get rough in disciplining Melena, Marcus intervenes before Paco shoves him into the lake and leaves with Melena. A vengeful Marcus rides his bicycle to Melena's apartment building and coldcocks Paco.

Marcus and Melena leave and camp out in a tent for the day. They plan to meet at Penn Station at noon the next day to catch the train after coming to a consensus that they will travel to New Mexico. In order to procure the amount of money it costs for the train fare, Marcus joins his friends in the robbery plot.

In the apartment, Harold finds and secretly steals the officer's gun before the group departs and returns to the clubhouse. Meanwhile, in his search for Melena, Paco sneaks inside the clubhouse and looks around. When he hears the group approaching, he hides in the closet.

Chip insults Harold's ability to play darts which results in Harold pulling out the stolen gun and shooting the target on the dartboard to show off. Unknowingly, Harold has shot and killed Paco (through the closet door the dart board was hanging on) whose corpse falls from the closet. Unable to lift the body, Marcus takes the keys to Paco's tow truck from his pocket, and uses the crane on the tow truck to lift Paco and release him into a shallow grave. Harold feels guilty and Marcus fears that he may go to the police. He warns Benny to not let Harold talk before telling him he changed his mind and he is resuming his plans to go to New Mexico, though promises he'll return in two weeks.

On the day Marcus and Melena are supposed to leave for New Mexico, Marcus visits the ruins of a building where he keeps a hidden stash of cash, only to find that it's missing along with the loot from the robbery. While Marcus is riding his bicycle downtown, he notices Chip showing off his brand new Diamondback bicycle to a crowd of onlookers. Marcus punches him in the face, accusing Chip of stealing the robbery loot and his stash of cash to pay for the bike. Justin and Shane accost Marcus before Justin reveals he stole Marcus's money. Justin, Shane, and Chip then mercilessly beat Marcus to the ground before leaving.

Immediately after, Marcus returns to the clubhouse and takes the gun before noticing an unmarked car and police cruiser pull up and it's revealed that Benny had reported Paco's murder to the police. Meanwhile, two police officers question Lucy on Marcus's whereabouts. Soon after, Chip is arrested by the police.

Running out of time and desperate for cash, Marcus enters a convenience store and holds the cashier, Duane, at gunpoint. Duane (Terry Alexander) hands over the cash and Marcus promises to pay him back. Marcus races to Penn Station where he reunites with Melena. The two board the train and Melena, not knowing her father is dead, remarks that her dad is going to kill her when he finds out she ran away. Marcus, knowing full well Paco won't be able to anything of the sort, doesn't respond.

Cast
Brendan Sexton III - Marcus Frederick
Antoine McLean - Harold
Mtume Gant - Louis
Carlo Alban - Benny
David Roland Frank - Chip
Adrian Grenier - Punk
Lynn Cohen - Lucy
L.M. Kit Carson - Mack
Shawn Elliott - Paco
Jose Zuniga - Kramer
Edie Falco - Joanna
Heather Matarazzo - Ashley

References

External links
 
 
 

1997 films
1990s teen drama films
American teen drama films
American coming-of-age drama films
American independent films
1990s English-language films
United Artists films
Films directed by Morgan J. Freeman
Films scored by Theodore Shapiro
Films set in Manhattan
Films shot in New York City
1997 directorial debut films
1997 drama films
1997 independent films
1990s American films